Diospyros ulo is a tree in the family Ebenaceae. Inflorescences bear up to three or more flowers. The tree is named for the Philippine local name ulo. Habitat is lowland mixed dipterocarp forests. D. ulo is found in Borneo and the Philippines.

References

ulo
Plants described in 1916
Trees of Borneo
Trees of the Philippines